The 1993 Merdeka Tournament was the 34th edition of the Merdeka Tournament and was held from February 5 to February 14, 1993, at Kuala Lumpur, Malaysia.

Groups

Group stage

Group A

Group B

Knockout stage

Semi finals

Finals

Award

External links
 1993 Merdeka Tournament at RSSF.com website

Merdeka Cup
Merd
Merd
Merdeka
1993 in Malaysian football
1992–93 in Swiss football
1993 in South Korean football
Mer